Birtukan Adamu Ali (born 29 April 1992) is an Ethiopian runner competing primarily in the 3000 metres steeplechase. She represented her country at the 2011 World Championships finishing twelfth. She is the current world junior record holder in the event.

Competition record

Personal bests
Outdoor
3000 metres steeplechase – 9:20.37 (Rome 2011)
Indoor
3000 metres – 8:58.73 (Karlsruhe 2012)
5000 metres – 15:34.15 (Stockholm 2015)

References

1992 births
Living people
Ethiopian female steeplechase runners
World Athletics Championships athletes for Ethiopia
African Games bronze medalists for Ethiopia
African Games medalists in athletics (track and field)
Athletes (track and field) at the 2011 All-Africa Games
Ethiopian Athletics Championships winners
21st-century Ethiopian women